KNMI (88.9 FM, "Vertical Radio") is a non-commercial radio station licensed to the community of Farmington, New Mexico, United States.  The station is owned by Educational Media Foundation.

KNMI broadcasts a Contemporary Christian music format to the Four Corners area. It was the first Christian radio station in the Four Corners area.

History
This station received its original construction permit from the Federal Communications Commission on August 3, 1979. The new station was assigned the call letters KNMI by the FCC on August 3, 1979. KNMI began regular broadcasting on March 6, 1980, and received its license to cover from the FCC on October 6, 1980.

On April 16, 2021, Navajo Ministries filed to sell KNMI and its dependent translators to the Educational Media Foundation for $225,000. The sale was consummated on May 27, 2021.

Translators
In addition to the main station, KNMI is relayed by an additional two broadcast translators to widen its coverage area.

References

External links
Navajo Ministries

Contemporary Christian radio stations in the United States
Radio stations established in 1980
San Juan County, New Mexico
NMI
Educational Media Foundation radio stations